Syrbula is a genus of slant-faced grasshoppers in the family Acrididae. There are at least three described species in Syrbula.

Species
These three species belong to the genus Syrbula:
 Syrbula admirabilis (Uhler, 1864) (admirable grasshopper)
 Syrbula festina Otte, D., 1979
 Syrbula montezuma (Saussure, 1861) (Montezuma's grasshopper)

References

Further reading

External links

 

Acrididae